Samvel Karapetyan may refer to:

 Samvel Karapetyan (author) (1961 - 2020), Armenian historian, researcher and author
 Samvel Karapetyan (businessman) (born 1966), Armenian-born Russian businessman
Samvel Karapetyan (general) (born 1962), Karabakh Armenian general